Acacia rendlei is a shrub of the genus Acacia and the subgenus Phyllodineae that is endemic to south western Australia.

Description
Like most species of Acacia it has phyllodes rather than true leaves. It blooms from October to December and produces yellow flowers. The simple inflorescences occur singly or in pairs in the axils and have spherical flower-heads containing 26 to 32 golden coloured flowers.

Distribution
It is native to an area in the Wheatbelt and Goldfields-Esperance regions of Western Australia where it is often situated on flats and low hills growing in rocky calcareous loamy or sandy soils. It has a scattered distribution from around the Parker Range in the west to around Kanandah Station in the east where it is often found as a part of open Eucalyptus woodland communities.

See also
List of Acacia species

References

rendlei
Acacias of Western Australia
Taxa named by Joseph Maiden
Plants described in 1917